Solanas is a Spanish surname. Notable people with the surname include:
 Alberto Solanas (born 1995), Spanish athlete
 Fernando Solanas (1936–2020), Argentine film director
 Ignacio Martín Solanas (born 1962), Spanish footballer
 Juan Diego Solanas (born 1966), Argentine film director
 Valerie Solanas (1936–1988), American feminist

Spanish-language surnames